Lyne is a surname, and may refer to

Adrian Lyne, British film maker
Andrew Lyne, British physicist
Becky Lyne, British middle-distance runner
Carmichael Lyne, Australian politician
Charlie Lyne, British film journalist
Joseph Leycester Lyne, British Anglican preacher and promoter of monasticism
Lanham Lyne, Texas politician
William Lyne, Australian politician

See also
Lyne (disambiguation)
Lynes (disambiguation)
Ó Laighin